Nikolskoye 1-ye is a rural locality (a settlement) in Dmitriyevskoye Rural Settlement, Paninsky District, Voronezh Oblast, Russia. The population was 52 as of 2010. There are 2 streets.

Geography 
Nikolskoye 1-ye is located on the right bank of the Pravaya Khava River, 20 km north of Panino (the district's administrative centre) by road. Dmitriyevka is the nearest rural locality.

References 

Rural localities in Paninsky District